Helen Rule is a British actress based in Cornwall, England.

Career
In 2002 she landed her first film role, after completing a 2-year BTEC National Diploma acting course, in a Cornish language feature film Hwerow Hweg. The film went on to be nominated for best feature at the Celtic Media Festival and was released in Wales, Canada and Brittany. Rule was then cast in several short films including a domestic violence awareness film which led to a role in the award-winning  thriller The Lark starring Mary Woodvine and Phil Jacobs and her first major film role in horror  Siren Song starring C Thomas Howell. Theatre credits include West-Side Story and Coriolanus with appearances as a student in Nutcracker Suite and Cinderella (with the European ballet).

Television

Film

References

External links
 

Living people
Actresses from Cornwall
English film actresses
Year of birth missing (living people)